Travis Dickinson (born 19 March 1988) is an English boxer who fights in the light heavyweight division.  He is from Edmondsley in County Durham.

Travis was English Light-Heavyweight champion and
also won the light-heavyweight version of the Prizefighter title on 29 January 2011 with victories over Llewellyn Davies, Justin Jones and Sam Couzens at the Olympia in London.  Dickinson followed the footsteps of his brother Jon-Lewis Dickinson who was British Cruiserweight champion and had also previously won the Cruiserweight version of the Prizefighter tournament. These are the only pair of brothers ever to win Prizefighter.

Dickinson made his boxing debut on 6 May 2009 beating Patrick Mendy over four rounds at the Robin Park Arena in Wigan and is unbeaten.
He beat Matty Clarkson in The maxi-Nutrition tournament, winning him the English Light-Heavyweight title, stopping him in an unbelievable fight.
This bout was nominated for The fight of the year and was an eliminator for the British Light-Heavyweight title.

References

English male boxers
Light-heavyweight boxers
Living people
1988 births